Wall High School is a public high school located in the rural community of Wall, Texas in Tom Green County, United States and is classified as a 3A school by the UIL. It is a part of the Wall Independent School District located in east central Tom Green County serving the communities of Wall, Vancourt, and surrounding rural areas. In 2013, the school was rated "Met Standard" by the Texas Education Agency.

Academics
Wall High School has obtained state titles within these U.I.L. academic events:
 Computer Science
 2008 (2A) - Team
 2008 (2A) - Individual
 2009 (2A) - Team
 2010 (2A) - Team
 2011 (2A) - Team
 2012 (2A) - Individual
 2012 (2A) - Team
 2013 (2A) - Individual
 2013 (2A) - Team
 2019 (3A) - Team
 Computer Applications
 2004 (2A) - Individual
 2013 (2A) - Individual
 Editorial Writing
 2018 (3A) - Individual
 Number Sense
 1971 (1A) - Individual
 1972 (1A) - Individual
 1973 (2A) - Individual

Wall High School has obtained state titles within these Robotics events:
 TCEA Robotics
2017 Inventions Team
2017 Arena Team
2018 Arena Team

Athletics 
Wall High School has obtained state titles within these U.I.L. athletic events:
Baseball
2019 (3A)
Basketball
2014 (Girls 2A) 
2016 (Girls 3A)
Cross Country
2006 (Boys 2A) - Team
2006 (Boys 2A) - Individual
2007 (Girls 2A) - Team
2008 (Boys 2A) - Team
Golf
2007 (Girls 2A)
2008 (Girls 2A)
2009 (Girls 2A)
2011 (Boys 2A)
2021 (Girls 3A)
Lone Star Cup
2017 (3A)
Tennis
1984 (Boys Singles 2A)
1990 (Boys Singles 2A)
1991 (Boys Singles 2A)
2002 (Boys Singles 2A)
2003 (Boys Singles 2A)
2004 (Boys Singles 2A)
2010 (Mixed Doubles 2A)
2011 (Boys Doubles 2A)
2013 (Girls Doubles 2A)
2016 (Mixed Doubles 3A) 
2018 (Boys Doubles 3A)
2019 (Boys Doubles 3A)
2021 (Boys Singles 3A)
Track
1972 (Boys 2A)

References

External links
Wall ISD

Schools in Tom Green County, Texas
Public high schools in Texas